Biy-Myrza (formerly Telman) is a village in Kara-Kulja District of Osh Region of Kyrgyzstan. Its population was 4,003 in 2021.

The village is the birthplace of the  5th president Sooronbay Jeenbekov and his brother ex-chairman Asylbek Jêênbekov.

References
 

Populated places in Osh Region